Optimo Espacio ('Optimum Space') was a weekly Sunday-night club based in Glasgow, Scotland at the Sub Club on Jamaica Street, as well as a collective moniker for the night's resident DJ duo. Having run every week since it was founded in 1997, on 11 March 2010, it was announced on the official Facebook page that the weekly nights would come to an end on Sunday 25 April 2010. However, JD Twitch and JG Wilkes continued to tour, promote and release music as Optimo.

Often known simply as Optimo, the club takes its name from the eponymous Liquid Liquid song and 1983 EP title.  JD Twitch and JG Wilkes (real names Keith McIvor and Jonnie Wilkes), the club's founders and resident DJs, are also collectively known as Optimo and have toured in Europe, America, Australia and Japan  and released music under that name. In 2011 they visited China to play Split Works' inaugural Black Rabbit festival.  Renowned for its diverse music policy, the club retains a reputation for adventurous innovation and hedonism. The technical side of the club has been written about in The Guardian. Twitch and Wilkes were described by Pitchfork Media in 2006 as being "one of the best DJ duos going right now."

In November 2006, Optimo appeared on BBC Radio 1's "Essential Mix."

Optimo regularly receives reviews from the media. For example, The Skinny published an article in December 2006 saying that Optimo is "still one of Scotland's best and most charismatic nights" and awarded it a "shiny gold star." In another article from the same magazine, the Optimo DJs were described as having a "special talent for mixing every genre under the sun."

Many well established music artists have played at Optimo. Examples include Cut Copy, Franz Ferdinand, The Rapture, Peaches, Isolée, Shitdisco, Chicks on Speed, Liquid Liquid, LCD Soundsystem, Hot Chip, Richie Hawtin, The Long Blondes, The Presets, Voxtrot, TV on the Radio, The Go! Team, The Kills, Sons and Daughters, Ivan Smagghe and Datarock.

Record label
Optimo started a new record label called Optimo Music in January 2009, with a 7" of Big Ned's "Bad Angel/Killer". Other releases include Den Haan, Dollskabeat, Divorce, Older Lover, Chris Carter and Factory Floor. Prior to this Optimo owned the Optimo Singles Club And Related Recordings (OSCARR) label, having released records by Creme Du Menthe, Park Attack, Bis, Pro Forma, Magic Daddy and Findo Gask.

In 2017, Optimo released Lo Kindre's "Plant Up" and Iona Fortune's "Tao of I".

Discography

Mix albums
 How To Kill The DJ (Part Two) - Various  (2004)      Kill the DJ/Tigersushi Records
 Optimo Present Psyche Out    - Various  (2005)       Eskimo Recordings
 Walkabout - Various (2006)                           Mule Musiq
 Sub Club 20 Years Underground - Various (2008) Soma
 Sleepwalk - Various (2008) Domino
 Fabric 52 - Various (2010) Fabric

References

External links
 Optimo Website
 Complete Discography
 Eskimo Recordings
 Tigersushi Records
 Pitchfork's review of "Psyche Out"
 Anna Chapman's Optimo Interview 
 Kit Macdonald's Resident Advisor feature on the end of Optimo

Nightclubs in Glasgow